Osei Bonsu Amoah is the member of parliament for the constituency. He was elected on the ticket of the New Patriotic Party (NPP),
and won a majority of 12,297 votes to become the MP. He succeeded Magnus Opare-Asamoah who had represented the constituency in the 4th Republic parliament on the ticket of the New Patriotic Party (NPP).

See also
List of Ghana Parliament constituencies

References

Parliamentary constituencies in the Eastern Region (Ghana)